David Weil is an American writer, producer, director and showrunner for television.  He is known for creating the Amazon Prime Video television series Hunters (2020–2023).  He is also known for creating the Amazon anthology miniseries Solos (2021).  He also co-created the series Invasion (2021–present) with Simon Kinberg for Apple TV+.

Weil grew up in Great Neck, New York.  He is Jewish.  He is also the grandson of Holocaust survivors.

Filmography

References

External links
 

Living people
American television directors
Showrunners
American television producers
American television writers
American male television writers
Year of birth missing (living people)